Tandilia is a genus of moths of the family Noctuidae.

Species
Tandilia fuscicosta (Draudt, 1924)

References
Natural History Museum Lepidoptera genus database

Noctuinae